The 2012–13 Polish Cup was the 56th edition of the Polish Volleyball Cup tournament.

ZAKSA Kędzierzyn-Koźle won their fourth trophy in club history after beating Asseco Resovia in the final (3–1).

Final four
 Venue: HWS, Częstochowa
 All times are Central European Time (UTC+01:00).

Semifinals
|}

Final

|}

Final standings

Awards

Most Valuable Player	
  Felipe Fonteles (ZAKSA Kędzierzyn-Koźle)
Best Server
  Michał Ruciak  (ZAKSA Kędzierzyn-Koźle)
Best Receiver	
  Piotr Gacek (ZAKSA Kędzierzyn-Koźle)
Best Defender
  Krzysztof Ignaczak (Asseco Resovia)
	
Best Blocker	
  Łukasz Wiśniewski (ZAKSA Kędzierzyn-Koźle)
Best Opposite Spiker
  Felipe Fonteles (ZAKSA Kędzierzyn-Koźle)
Best Setter
  Paweł Zagumny (ZAKSA Kędzierzyn-Koźle)

See also
 2012–13 PlusLiga

References

External links
 Official website

Polish Cup
Polish Cup
Polish Cup
Polish Cup